Joan Margret Beck, BEM, (1918-2014) was an Australian archaeologist and fencer.

Sport and fencing
In 1937 associate teacher at Bjelke-Petersen School of Physical Culture. 
After being introduced to fencing she was instrumental in the development of fencing in Australia in the mid-20th century. At the Swords Club she was coached by Owen Weingott.
She provided instruction in fencing in England (in 1951, she earned the title Professor of Fencing from the British Academy of Fencing) and later throughout the Sydney region, in schools, universities including the Australian College of Physical Education,  and health settings, such as the Royal North Shore Hospital introducing fencing to paraplegic athletes, including Daphne Ceeney, and to Olympic athletes.
1952 Beck took the position of head coach at the Swords Club and found new premises at Bjelke-Petersen.
Between 1952 – 1972 Beck trained state and national teams and prepared participants for every Empire and Commonwealth games.

Archeology
She studied archeology at Macquarie University and had extensive contact with Professor Naguib Kanawati, she worked on digs and went to Egypt 11 times and Greece 14 times. She supported the development of the Rundle Foundation for Egyptian Archaeology at Macquarie University and was instrumental in it becoming an active, heavily subscribed society. Her services to the university and to Egyptology led to the award of 'Honorary Fellow of Macquarie University'.

Early life and education
She studied at MLC School, Burwood and Bjelke-Petersen School of Physical Culture, and after retiring from fencing at Macquarie University.

References

External links
Suzanne Newton, (February 2013), The Swords Club pays tribute to Joan Beck -a Grande Dame of NSW fencing, On Target: Newsletter of Fencing NSW

Australian female fencers
1918 births
2014 deaths
Australian archaeologists
Australian women archaeologists
Australian schoolteachers
People from New South Wales